James Larkin (1874–1947) was an Irish trade union leader, politician and socialist activist.

James Larkin may also refer to:
James Larkin (actor) (born 1963), English actor
James Larkin (Independent Fianna Fáil) (1932–1998), Irish politician from Donegal, nominated as Senator in 1982
James Larkin Jnr (1904–1969), Irish Labour Party politician and trade union official
Jim Larkin (American football) (born 1939), American football coach at Saginaw Valley State University
Jim Larkin (publisher) (born 1949), publisher of the Phoenix New Times and co-owner of Backpage
Jim Larkin (politician) (born 1946), Canadian politician and businessman